is a Japanese actress and model.

Takahashi made her acting debut in 2004, playing the role of Amano Sora in TV Asahi's Sky High 2. In 2005, she made her film debut as Fumie Hayashida in Simsons. Since her debut Takahashi has worked with many prominent directors; playing Kawahime, the River Princess, in  Takashi Miike's horror-fantasy children's film Yokai Daisenso (released in the U.S. in 2006 as The Great Yokai War.) She also appeared in Sion Sono's 2005 film Kimyo na Sakasu (Strange Circus), Yoshihiro Nakamura's Busu (The Booth, 2005), and in Hitoshi Yazaki's 2006 film Strawberry Shortcakes. In 2008, she appeared in the live action film Pyū to Fuku! Jaguar.

She has also voiced the characters Yuri Kishida, Kanae and Ryuuko Tagawa in the 2006 video game Siren 2, and played 'The girl in red' in the movie adaptation of the game Siren in the same year.

Along with her acting career Mai Takahashi has also appeared in magazines, and has also released two photobooks.

Selected filmography
 2005: The Great Yokai War
 2005: Strange Circus
 2005: The Booth
 2006: Forbidden Siren
 2006: Strawberry Shortcakes
 2009: Fish Story
 2012: Isn't Anyone Alive?

External links
 (as Seiko Iwaidô)
Amuse talent profile
SciFi Japan » THE GREAT YOKAI WAR

1984 births
Living people
Japanese television actresses
Actors from Fukuoka Prefecture
Models from Fukuoka Prefecture
Japanese gravure idols